Häädetkeidas Strict Nature Reserve (Häädetkeitaan luonnonpuisto) is located in the Pirkanmaa and Satakunta regions of Finland. This thick, ancient forest and swamp reserve is inaccessible to the public. Bears and beavers make up some of the animal populations here and nearby regions.

Strict nature reserves of Finland
Geography of Pirkanmaa
Geography of Satakunta
Protected areas established in 1956
1956 establishments in Finland